Vitali Vladimirovich Pugin (born 19 December 1978) is a former Russian professional football player.

Club career
He played in the Russian Football National League for FC Tekstilshchik-Telekom Ivanovo in 2007.

References

External links
 

1978 births
Sportspeople from Ivanovo
Living people
Russian footballers
Association football defenders
FC Tekstilshchik Ivanovo players
FC Spartak Kostroma players